James Turner Morehead (May 24, 1797 – December 28, 1854) was a United States Senator and the 12th Governor of Kentucky. He was the first native-born Kentuckian to hold the governorship of the state. A member of Henry Clay's National Republican Party, Morehead entered politics just as his party was beginning to challenge the Democratic Party's dominance in the state.

Morehead was nominated for lieutenant governor at his party's nominating convention in Baltimore, Maryland in 1831, and was elected on a split ticket with Democratic governor John Breathitt. He ascended to the governorship upon Breathitt's death in 1834. Saddled with a shortened term, Morehead was not able to formulate a significant legislative agenda, and stuck to the politically safe issue of internal improvements during his term. When his party changed its name to the Whig Party and wrested control of the General Assembly from the Democrats in the summer of 1834, Morehead hosted the new party's first nominating convention in Frankfort.

Following his term as governor, Morehead returned to the state legislature. An opponent of abolitionism, he accompanied John Speed Smith to Ohio to secure the return of slaves owned by Kentuckians. He was later appointed to the U.S. Senate, where he remained a close ally of Clay's. In 1847, he retired to Covington, Kentucky, practicing law until his death in 1854. The city of Morehead, Kentucky is named in honor of Governor Morehead.

Early life and career
James Turner Morehead was born on May 24, 1797 near Shepherdsville, Kentucky in Bullitt County. His parents, Armistead and Lucy (Latham) Morehead, moved to Russellville, Kentucky when he was very young, and he was educated at the public schools in that city. He attended Transylvania University in Lexington, Kentucky from 1813 to 1815. He then returned to Russellville, where he studied law under circuit court judge H. P. Broadnax and John J. Crittenden. He was admitted to the bar in 1818, and commenced practice in Bowling Green, Kentucky.

On May 1, 1823, Morehead married Susan A. Roberts; the couple had two children. He was elected to the Kentucky House of Representatives representing Warren County from 1828 to 1831. While there, he served on the Committee on Internal Improvements, and reported a bill for state subscription to the Maysville-Lexington Turnpike Company in 1831.

Governor of Kentucky
In 1831, Morehead was also a delegate to the National Republican Party Convention in Baltimore, Maryland that nominated Henry Clay for president. During the convention, he was nominated for the office of lieutenant governor. Though his National Republican running mate, Richard A. Buckner, was defeated by Democrat John Breathitt, Morehead was elected the ninth Lieutenant Governor.

Governor Breathitt died of tuberculosis on February 21, 1834, and Morehead was sworn in as governor the following day. The replacement of a Democratic governor with one from the rival National Republican party caused a great deal of angst among Democrats, but the ascendancy of Democrat James Guthrie to president of the state senate and Morehead's willingness to retain Breathitt's secretary of state, Lewis Saunders, did much to allay their fears.

Later that year, the National Republican party began to re-brand itself as the Whig Party, a name that first appeared in the Lexington Intelligencer on April 25, 1834. On July 4, 1834, Governor Morehead hosted the party's first convention in Frankfort. Kentuckians flocked to the "new" party en masse, and the legislative elections of August 1834 saw the party garner majorities in both houses of the state legislature. Flexing their political muscles, the majority party ousted Guthrie from his post as president of the Senate and by a vote of 90–40, and sent John J. Crittenden instead of Guthrie to the U.S. Senate in 1835.

In his first address to the legislature, Morehead recommended a plan of expanded internal improvements, including improvements along the state's rivers. The legislature responded by creating a state board of internal improvements, and named Morehead the ex-officio president of the board. In this role, he authorized many surveys of Kentucky's rivers and formulated several plans for improvements, but most of them were blocked by the Panic of 1837. One improvement that did proceed was construction of the Lexington and Ohio Railroad, which was completed in 1835. Though education was not a high priority for Governor Morehead, the Kentucky Common School Society and the Kentucky Association of Professional Teachers were formed during his term.

Later career

Following his service as governor, Morehead resumed his legal practice in Frankfort, Kentucky. In March 1837, he was commissioned by Governor James Clark to act as an agent for the state, selling bonds to fund internal improvements. He returned to the state House from 1837 to 1838, representing Franklin County. He was president of the Kentucky Board of Internal Improvements from 1838 to 1841, and in 1839, he and John Speed Smith were chosen as commissioners to the state of Ohio to secure the return of Kentucky-owned slaves as property of their masters. They were successful in this endeavor.

Learned in Kentucky history, Morehead published An Address in Commemoration of the First Settlement of Kentucky, which contained original information regarding the early settlement of Boonesborough, Kentucky, in 1840. In 1846, he published another book, Practice in Civil Actions and Proceedings at Law.

In 1841, Morehead was elected to the U.S. Senate and served from March 4, 1841 to March 3, 1847. There he was chairman of the U.S. Senate Committee on Indian Affairs and the Committee on Retrenchment. During his service in the Senate, he defended a federal bank bill and opposed the annexation of Texas, though he supported the U.S.-Mexican War after it began. He was also a staunch supporter of fellow Kentuckian Henry Clay.

After his time in Congress, he continued the practice of law in Covington, Kentucky until his death. He was interred in the State lot of Frankfort Cemetery, Frankfort, Kentucky. The city of Morehead, Kentucky was named after him.

References

Bibliography

Further reading
 Dictionary of American Biography
 Jillson, W.R., ed. "Early Political Papers of Governor James T. Morehead." Register of the Kentucky State Historical Society 22 (September 1924): 272–300, 23 (January 1925): 36–61.

External links

James Turner Morehead at The Political Graveyard

1797 births
1854 deaths
People from Bullitt County, Kentucky
American people of Scottish descent
Baptists from Kentucky
Kentucky National Republicans
Kentucky Whigs
American proslavery activists
Whig Party United States senators from Kentucky
Governors of Kentucky
National Republican Party state governors of the United States
Whig Party state governors of the United States
Lieutenant Governors of Kentucky
Members of the Kentucky House of Representatives
Kentucky lawyers
Transylvania University alumni
Burials at Frankfort Cemetery
19th-century American lawyers
19th-century Baptists
19th-century American politicians